Legal matter management or matter management refers to activities involved in managing all aspects of the corporate legal practice ("matters").  Matter management is distinguished from case management, in that case management is generally considered to refer to law firm related activities ("cases").  Matter management software systems serve a variety of functions including conflict and ethics control, accurate matter opening, day-to-day matter work, business intelligence, and marketing.  This includes the tracking of such items as the attorneys and other workers on the case, type of legal work, industry of the client, witnesses, judges, Courts, opposing counsel, issues, documents, budgets and invoices associated with each particular legal matter.

Corporations can use matter legal matter management software and systems to manage both their in-house counsel staffs as well as their outside counsel law firms and non-law firm legal service providers who work on legal matters on the corporation's behalf (i.e., expert witnesses, court reporters, copy services, etc.). Law firms might use matter management to organize information about documents and email, time worked or billed, people inside and outside the firm associated with case, deadlines and dockets, and much more.

Matter management systems can provide excellent communication and collaboration platforms to organize and distribute information, although new web-based collaboration tools are beginning to reduce the need for matter management systems as collaboration tools.  Matter-centric collaboration tools may be the next step.
  
As these systems entail the processing and storage of confidential corporate and insurance carrier financial data, sensitive claims information, and privileged legal matter data, major considerations in the deployment of these systems are: availability of matter-level security, ability to handle ethical walls, the level of customization the software offers, whether the software can be installed "behind corporate security and firewalls" or if the software is only hosted as an Internet-based ASP application and whether or not the deployment methodology meets Sarbanes-Oxley and HIPAA security and audit compliance mandates.

Legal project management is a form of matter management that leverages the standards and practices of professional project management to more effectively manage legal matters or specific phases of a legal matter (e.g., legal-discovery projects). 

Project management by type
Legal communication
Knowledge management